Qarabaghi, Qarabagh or Karabagh the word Qarabaghi also spelled as Qara Baghi is a tribe of Hazara people in Afghanistan, who are mostly from Qarabagh district of Ghazni Province.

Etymology 
Qarabagh is compound of the Turkic word qara or kara (black) and Persian word bagh (garden), meaning black garden.

See also 
 Qarabagh District
 List of Hazara tribes

References 

Hazara tribes
Ethnic groups in Ghazni Province